Phil Nicholls (born 22 June 1952) is an English former professional footballer who played as a central defender.

Career
Born in Bilston, Nicholls played for Wolverhampton Wanderers, Crewe Alexandra, Bradford City and Kidderminster Harriers.

References

1952 births
Living people
English footballers
Wolverhampton Wanderers F.C. players
Crewe Alexandra F.C. players
Bradford City A.F.C. players
Kidderminster Harriers F.C. players
English Football League players
Association football central defenders